The City of Milton Keynes is a unitary authority area with both borough and city status, in Buckinghamshire.  It is the northernmost district of the South East England Region. The borough abuts Bedfordshire, Northamptonshire and the remainder of Buckinghamshire.

The principal built-up area in the borough is the Milton Keynes urban area, which accounts for about 20% of its area and 90% of its population. The ONS's provisional return from the 2021 census reports that the population of the borough has reached approximately 287,000.

History

The local authority was created on 1 April 1974 under the Local Government Act 1972, as a District under the (then) Buckinghamshire County Council, by the merger of Bletchley Urban District, Newport Pagnell Urban District, Newport Pagnell Rural District and Wolverton Urban District, together with that part of Wing Rural District within the designated New Town area.  The district council applied for and received borough status that year. It was originally one of five non-metropolitan districts of Buckinghamshire. On 1 April 1997, it became a self-governing non-metropolitan county, independent from (the former) Buckinghamshire County Council.

In August 2022, the council received letters patent giving the Borough the status of a city.

Local government

Arising from the local government elections of May 2021, the borough is governed by a Labour and Liberal Democrat coalition administration. The Conservative Party is the main opposition group.

, political composition of the council is as follows.

The 2022 local election did not change the status of the council from 'no overall control'. No political party has had an 'overall majority' on the council since 2006.

Economy
According to data from the Office of National Statistics for 2017, the borough was the highest performing NUTS3 region in the UK outside inner London (which takes the first five places), on the basis of gross value added per head.

Education

Further education in the borough is provided by Milton Keynes College. For higher education, the Open University's headquarters are in Milton Keynes though, as this is a distance education institution, the only students resident on campus are approximately 200 full-time postgraduates. A campus of the University of Bedfordshire located in Central Milton Keynes, provides conventional undergraduate courses.

Cranfield University is the academic partner in project with Milton Keynes City Council to establish a new university, code-named "MK:U", 

on a reserved site in the city centre.  , the project is stalled pending assurance of government funding.

Demographics

Population

At the 2011 census, the population of the borough was 248,821.  The ONS's provisional return from the 2021 census reports that the population of the borough has reached approximately 287,000.

The borough's population age profile is slightly younger than England's average, with half of the borough's population aged under 35 years old.  The 30- to 39-year-olds in the borough formed as the largest 10-year age group of the population with 30- to 34-year-olds being the largest 5-year age group, 22.3% are aged under 16 and just 11.1% are aged over 65 compared.

Levels of educational attainment in the borough are slightly higher than the England average. 18% have no qualifications compared with 22.5% in England, while 28.2% have a degree or higher qualification compared with 27.4% in England.

Ethnicity 
In the 2021 census, almost 71.8% of the population described their ethnic origin as white, 12.3% as Asian, 9.7% as black, 4% as mixed, and 2% as another ethnic group.

Religion 
In the 2011 census, 62% of the population professed a religious belief. Christianity was the largest denomination, with 53% of the total. At the 2021 census, again 62% professed a religious belief. Christianity remained the largest denomination but its share (of a greater population) fell to 43% of the total.

Housing and home ownership
In 2011, the borough had the greatest proportion of shared ownership homes in England, 6.1%, compared with second-placed London boroughs of Hounslow and Tower Hamlets with 2.4%. This form of home ownership has been a planning policy of the Council soon after the settled acceptance of all major UK lenders on specified forms of this type of property ownership was agreed in the 2000s decade.

The borough has relatively high home ownership at 72.8% of dwellings with the remaining 16.2% of homes are privately rented and 11.0% are socially rented.

At the 2012, 16.2% of the population lived in flats (apartments), compared with the 22.1% average for England.

Public health
According to Public Health England, "The health of people in Milton Keynes is generally similar to the England average. About 15.1% (8,680) children live in low income families. Life expectancy for both men and women is similar to the England average."

Settlements

Milton Keynes (urban area)

''The urban area accounts for about 20% of the borough by area and 90% by population. This is a partial list of the districts of the Milton Keynes urban area.

The City of Milton Keynes is fully parished. These are the parishes, and the districts they contain, that are now elements of the Milton Keynes built-up area as defined by the Office for National Statistics. Bletchley, Fenny Stratford, Woburn Sands, Central Milton Keynes, Newport Pagnell, Wolverton and Stony Stratford are all towns.
 Abbey Hill: Kiln Farm, Two Mile Ash, Wymbush 
 Bletchley and Fenny Stratford: Brickfields, Central Bletchley, Denbigh, Mount Farm, Fenny Lock, Granby, Fenny Stratford, Newton Leys, Water Eaton
 Bradwell:  Bradville, Bradwell, Bradwell Abbey, Bradwell Common, Bradwell village, Heelands, Rooksley
 Broughton and Milton Keynes (the Village)a shared parish council: Atterbury, Brook Furlong, Broughton, Fox Milne, Middleton, Milton Keynes, Milton Keynes Village, Northfield, Oakgrove, Pineham
 Campbell Park (civil parish): Fishermead, Newlands, Oldbrook, Springfield, Willen and Willen Lake, Winterhill, The Woolstones
 Central Milton Keynes: Central MK, Campbell Park
 Fairfields
 Great Linford: Bolbeck Park, Blakelands, Conniburrow, Downs Barn, Downhead Park, Giffard Park, Great Linford, Neath Hill, Pennyland, Redhouse, Tongwell, Willen Park
 Kents Hill, Monkston and Brinklow: Brinklow, Kents Hill, Kingston, Monkston
 Loughton and Great Holm: Loughton, Loughton Lodge, Great Holm, Elfield Park, the Bowl
 New Bradwell
 Newport Pagnell
 Shenley Brook End: Emerson Valley, Furzton, Kingsmead, Shenley Brook End, Shenley Lodge, Snelshall, Tattenhoe, Tattenhoe Park, Westcroft
 Shenley Church End: Crownhill, Grange Farm, Hazeley, Medbourne, Oakhill, Oxley Park, Shenley Church End, Woodhill
 Simpson and Ashland: Ashland, Simpson, West Ashland
 Stantonbury: Bancroft/Bancroft Park, Blue Bridge, Bradville, Linford Wood, Oakridge Park, Stantonbury, Stantonbury Fields
 Stony Stratford: Fullers Slade, Galley Hill, Stony Stratford
 Walton: Caldecotte, Old Farm Park, Tilbrook, Tower Gate, Walnut Tree, Walton, Walton Hall, Walton Park, Wavendon Gate
 Wavendon: Wavendon, Eagle Farm, Glebe Farm
 West Bletchley: Far Bletchley, Old Bletchley, West Bletchley.
 Whitehouse
 Woburn Sands
 Wolverton and Greenleys: Greenleys, Stacey Bushes, Stonebridge, Wolverton, Old Wolverton
 Woughton: Beanhill, Bleak Hall, Coffee Hall, Eaglestone, Leadenhall, Netherfield, Peartree Bridge, Redmoor, Tinkers Bridge (part)
 Old Woughton: Passmore (part of Tinkers Bridge), Woughton on the Green, Woughton Park.

Rest of the borough
The rural area accounts for about 80% of the borough by area and about 10% by population. Olney is a town. These are the extra-urban civil parishes:
 Astwood and Hardmead
 Bow Brickhill
 Caldecote, Calverton, Castlethorpe, Chicheley, Clifton Reynes, Cold Brayfield
 Emberton
 Filgrave
 Gayhurst
 Hanslope, Haversham-cum-Little Linford
 Lathbury, Lavendon, Little Brickhill, Long Street
 Moulsoe
 Newton Blossomville, North Crawley
 Olney
 Ravenstone
 Sherington, Stoke Goldington
 Tyringham
 Warrington, Weston Underwood

Freedom of the City

The following people and military units have received the Freedom of the City (from 2022) or Freedom of the Borough (19822021).

Individuals
 Jock Campbell, Baron Campbell of Eskan: 18 March 1982.
 James Marshall: 2009.
 Dame Cleo Laine: 2011.
 Peter Winkelman: 12 November 2015.
 Leah Williamson: 28 February 2023. (first recipient of the Freedom of the City)

Military Units
 The Royal Green Jackets: 1998.
 The Rifles: 2007. (confirmation)
 678 (Rifles) Squadron 6 Regiment Army Air Corps: 11 March 2018.

Organisations and businesses
 Red Bull Racing, 2014

References

External links
 Milton Keynes Borough Council
 Map on the Milton Keynes Council's website showing civil parishes in the borough.

 
Non-metropolitan districts of Buckinghamshire
Unitary authority districts of England
Local government districts of South East England
Boroughs in England